Valiatrella is a genus of crickets in the tribe Podoscirtini.  Species have been recorded in: India, southern China and Vietnam.

Species 
The Orthoptera Species File includes the following species:
 Valiatrella bimaculata (Chopard, 1928)
 Valiatrella laminaria Liu & Shi, 2007
 Valiatrella multiprotubera Liu & Shi, 2007
 Valiatrella persicifolius Ma & Zhang, 2013
 Valiatrella pulchra (Gorochov, 1985) - type species (as Valia pulchra Gorochov)
 Valiatrella sororia (Gorochov, 2002)

References

External links
 

Ensifera genera
crickets
Orthoptera of Indo-China